Sigurd Grønli is the name of:

Sigurd Grønli (footballer) (born 2000), Norwegian footballer
Sigurd Grønli (rower) (1927–2001), Norwegian rower